Koichi Sasada is a Japanese computer scientist and a Ruby core committer. Formerly a member of Matz's team at Heroku, he will continue development on the Ruby interpreter. He was also an assistant professor at the University of Tokyo from 2008 to 2012. He was responsible for the development of YARV.

References

Japanese computer scientists
Living people
Year of birth missing (living people)
Place of birth missing (living people)
Academic staff of the University of Tokyo